The Ramallo massacre occurred on September 17, 1999, in Villa Ramallo, in northern Buenos Aires Province, Argentina, when three armed robbers broke into the local offices of the Banco de la Nación Argentina, taking six hostages. After several hours, they tried to escape in a car, using the bank manager and an accountant as human shields, and holding the manager's wife. A few meters ahead, a special group of the provincial police, the GEO, killed one of the suspects and the two hostages. Another suspect, Martín Saldaña, was found hanged in his cell just hours after the massacre; though it was assumed that he had committed suicide, in January 2007 new research showed that he had been murdered, possibly by first hitting him in the head, rendering him unconscious, and then strangling him.

Doubts about the police behaviour arose after the whole country saw footage of the police special unit deliberately shooting the car with hostages inside. 

After the massacre, several government officials blamed the media coverage for the tragic outcome, accusing journalists of an unprofessional treatment of the news. The provincial governor Eduardo Duhalde claimed that negotiations may have been negatively affected by the police constant communication with radio and television reporters.

On October 17, 1999, the Secretary of Justice and Security Buenos Aires, Carlos Soria, confirmed that police had acted as accomplices of the thieves who robbed the National Bank of Villa Ramallo, a fact which preceded the slaughter of two hostages and a criminal during the escape attempt. "There is, unfortunately, and as we all imagined, some police personnel directly involved," Soria told Radio América, Telam reported.

See also
List of massacres in Argentina

References

Further reading
 International Freedom of Expression Exchange (IFEX), 23 September 1999. Government officials blame the press for a massacre.
 Clarín, 19 October 2004. Comienza el juicio contra los policías de la Masacre de Ramallo. 
 Clarín, 12 November. La Policía sabía que íbamos en el auto, pero igual tiró. 
 Clarín, 29 January 2007. Masacre de Ramallo: piden que se investigue como un crimen el caso del asaltante que murió en la comisaría. 

Massacres in 1999

Presidency of Carlos Menem
Massacres in Argentina
1999 in Argentina
1999 murders in Argentina